The Breeze North Dorset was an Independent local radio station serving North Dorset

History
Launched on 25 June 1995 as Gold Radio then later became Vale FM when the station was acquired by TLRC.
The station, along with sister station Ivel FM was formed as Midwest Radio when the two stations were acquired from TLRC and merged to form one station.

In July 2008, Radio industry regulator Ofcom approved plans for the two stations to share 20 hours of output per day, saying the distance between stations is such that the relevance of regionalised programming is a sensible move for both, and represents a way of allowing smaller stations to operate more effectively without adverse effects for listeners. Despite this, the two separate licences still broadcast different breakfast shows between 6 a.m. and 10 a.m. on weekdays.

In August 2010 the 2 stations finally merged to create a single Midwest station across south Somerset and north Dorset, broadcasting from studios in Yeovil and Shaftesbury.

In December 2011, The Midwest stations were sold to Celador Radio, after Midwest Radio Ltd decided not to contest with the Bridgwater licence.

Rebrand as The Breeze

After an approval request with Ofcom, both stations have relaunched as The Breeze at midnight on 25 June 2012, merging with The Breeze in Bridgwater.

Closure
The Breeze was purchased by Bauer Media in 2019 along with many other radio stations. On 27 May 2020 it was announced that The Breeze will become Greatest Hits Radio from early September 2020.  The station went through a transitional period where it's playlist was changed over to the 70's, 80's and 90's era and jingles changed to reflect the station playing "greatest hits".   The Breeze was finally rebranded to Greatest Hits Radio at 6:00am on 1 September 2020.

See also
Bauer Radio
The Breeze (radio network)

References

External links

The Breeze listing on Media UK

Radio stations in Dorset
Former British radio networks